This list of compositions by Victor Herbert is sorted by genre.

Stage works

Other works

Orchestral music
Serenade for string orchestra, Op.12 (1884)
Irish Rhapsody (1892)
American Fantasy (or Fantasia) (1893) (Originally written for band)
Badinage (1895)
Suite Romantique, Op.31 (1900)
I. Visions
II. Aubade
III. Triomphe d'Amour
IV. Fête Nuptial
Hero and Leander, Op.33 (1901)
Auditorium Festival March (1901)
Pan Americana: Morceau characteristique (1901)
Suite Woodland Fancies, Op.34 (1902)
I. Morning of the Mountains
II. Forest Sylphs
III. Twilight
IV. Autumn Frolics
Suite Columbus, Op.35 (1904)
I. Dawn and Sunrise in Alhambra
II. At la Rabida (At the Convent)
III. Murmurs of the sea
IV. Triumph : The vision of Columbus
Indian Summer: An American Idyll (1919)
Three pieces for string orchestra (1912–1922)
I. Air de Ballet
II. Forget-me-not
III. Sunset
Suite of Serenades (1924)
I. Chinese
II. Spanish
III. Cuban
IV. Oriental

Concerto pieces
Suite for Cello and Orchestra, Op.3 (1882)
I. Allegro Moderato
II. Scherzo
III. Andante
IV Serenade: Andantino grazioso
V. Tarantelle
Cello Concerto No.1, Op.8 in D Major (1882)
Fantastia on "The Desire" (Schubert) for Cello and Orchestra (1891)
Fantasia on Cavalleria rusticana (Mascagni) for Violin and Orchestra (1893)
Légende for Cello and Orchestra (1893)
Cello Concerto No.2, Op.30 in E minor (1894)
Five pieces for Cello and Orchestra (1900) (arrangement from Sam Dennison and Orchestrated by Lynn Harrell)
I. Yesterthoughts, Op.37
II. Pensée amoureuse
III. Puchinello, Op.38
IV. Ghazel
V. The Mountainbrook
L'Encore for Flute, Clarinet and Orchestra (1910)

Chamber music

Cello and piano
Berceuse (1884)
Scherzino (1885)
Three pieces (1900–1906)
I. Romance
II. Pensée Amoureuse
III. Petite Valse
La Serenata (1911)
Alla Mazurka
Bagatelle
Polonaise

Violin and piano
A La Valse (1915)
Canzonetta, Opus 12, No. 4 (1928)
Little Red Lark (an arrangement of an old Irish melody)
Mirage

Other 
Reveré for English Horn and French Horn Quartet

Piano
Serenade 4 May (1884)
La Ghazel: Improvisation (1900)
La Coquette: Valze Brilliante (1900)
The Mountainbrook:  Imitative (1900)
On the Promenade: Morceau (1900)
Yesterthoughts: Meditation, Op.37 (1900)
Puchinello: Characteristic, Op.38 (1900)
Pan Americana: Morceau characteristique (1901)
Whispering Willows: Intermezzo (1915)
Devotion (A Love Sonnet for the Piano) (1921)
Duo (1923)
Fleurette: Waltz (1903)
Indian Summer: An American Idyll (1919)
Marion Davies March (1922)
Under the Elms, Souvenir de Saratoga
World's Progress March (1916)

Cantata and choral works
 Call to Freedom (aka God Shall Guide Us, 1918)
 The Captive, op. 25 (1892; contata for soprano solo, baritone solo, chorus and orchestra)
 Christ Is Risen
 Columbia Anthem (unison chorus with piano, later arr. by Herbert for orchestra and band, 1898)
 Eventide, op. 20 (for male chorus) (from Wanderer's Songs)
 O'Donnell Aboo! (1915)
 Orange, White and Blue (Written for ceremonies in 1916, in commemoration if the landing of the first Dutch settlers on Manhattan Island, May 4, 1626. The orange, white and blue flag of this Dutch colony was raised at Battery Park.)
 The Cruiskeen Lawn (dedicated to the Mendelsohn Glee Club, N. Y., 1913)
 The Hail of the Friendly Sons (for men's voices, a cappella, 1913)
 The New Ireland (for men's voices, a cappella, 1914)
 The Sunken City, op. 20, no. 1 (for men's voices, a cappella, 1897)
 Widow Machree (by Samuel Lover; arr. by Herbert, 1915)

Songs

 Ah! Love Me (Nur du bist's) (1888)
 Love's Token (Liebesleben) (1888)
 The Silent Rose (Die stille Rose) (1888)
 My Heart Is True [Mien Herz ist treu] (1891)
 Under an Oak (1894)
 When I Was Born I Weighed Ten Stone (1894)
 In Dreamland (1895)
 Jenny's Baby (1895)
 Me and Nancy (1895)
 What Is Love? (1895)
 Fairy Tales (1897)
 I Envy the Bird (1897)
 The Secret (1897)
 The Tattooed Man (1897)
 Gypsy Love Song (1898)
 Mary's Lamb (1898)
 The Serenades of All Nations (1898)
 Hear Me (1900)
 We'll Catch You at Last, Tivolini (1900)
 Barney O'Flynn (1903)
 I Can't Do the Sum (1903)
 Toyland (1903)
 March of the Toys (1903)
 If I Were on the Stage (1905)
 When the Cat's Away the Mice Will Play (1905)
 Moonbeams (1906)
 The Streets of New York (1906)
 Love Laid His Sleepless Head (1907)
 The Friars' Song (1907)
 Ask Her While the Band Is Playing (1908)
 Love Is Like a Cigarette (1908)
 Won't You Be My Valentine? (1908)
 I Want to Be a Good Lamb (1909)
 Ah! Sweet Mystery of Life (1910)
 I'm Falling in Love with Some One (1910)
 Italian Street Song (1910)
 Naughty Marietta (1910)
 'Neath the Southern Moon (1910)
 To the Land of My Own Romance (1911)
 Love's Hour (1912) (lyrics by Rida Johnson Young)
 Sweethearts (1913)
 If Love Were What the Rose Is (1914)
 The Love of the Lorelei (1914)
 When You're Away (1914)
 Remembrance (1915) (lyrics by Carl Weitbrecht)
 Sweet Harp of the Days (1915)
 An Easter Dawn (1917)
 I Might Be Your "Once-in-a-While" (1919)
 Indian Summer (1919) (originally a piano melody, later lyrics by Al Dubin)
 Molly (1919)
 My Day Has Come (1920) (lyrics by Irving Caesar)
 Equity Star (1921) (lyrics by Grant Stewart)
 A Kiss in the Dark (1922)
 Dream On (1922)
 Lora Lee Joseph (1922)
 Mary Came Over to Me (1922)
 When Knighthood Was in Flower (1922)
 God Spare the Emerald Isle (1923)
 Little Old New York (1923)
 Heart o'Mine (1924)

Songs of unknown date
 A Maiden Went into the Field Alone
 Confession
 Flower of My Heart
 Fly Away, Little Bird
 Fowling
 Give Your Heart in June-time
 If You But Knew
 I Love You
 Longing for Home
 Love Song
 Love's Life
 Love's Oracle Edward Peple
 Our Ireland Shall Be Free
 Only You
 Peace
 Spring Song
 The Faded Rose
 The First Kiss
 The Innkeeper's Daughter
 To Thee, My Queen of Beauty

Notes

Sources
Victor Herbert at musicaltheatreguide.com

Herbert